Succinyl-CoA ligase [ADP-forming] subunit beta, mitochondrial (SUCLA2), also known as  ADP-forming succinyl-CoA synthetase (SCS-A), is an enzyme that in humans is encoded by the SUCLA2 gene on chromosome 13.

Succinyl-CoA synthetase (SCS) is a mitochondrial matrix enzyme that acts as a heterodimer, being composed of an invariant alpha subunit and a substrate-specific beta subunit. The protein encoded by this gene is an ATP-specific SCS beta subunit that dimerizes with the SCS alpha subunit to form SCS-A, an essential component of the tricarboxylic acid cycle. SCS-A hydrolyzes ATP to convert  succinyl-CoA to succinate. Defects in this gene are a cause of myopathic mitochondrial DNA depletion syndrome. A pseudogene of this gene has been found on chromosome 6. [provided by RefSeq, Jul 2008]

Structure 
SCS, also known as succinyl CoA ligase (SUCL), is a heterodimer composed of a catalytic α subunit encoded by the SUCLG1 gene and a β subunit encoded by either the SUCLA2 gene or the SUCLG2 gene, which determines the enzyme specificity for either ADP or GDP. SUCLA2 is the SCS variant containing the SUCLA2-encoded β subunit. Amino acid sequence alignment of the two β subunit types reveals a homology of ~50% identity, with specific regions conserved throughout the sequences.

SUCLA2 is located on chromosome 13 and contains 13 exons.

Function 
As a subunit of SCS, SUCLA2 is a mitochondrial matrix enzyme that catalyzes the reversible conversion of succinyl-CoA to succinate and acetoacetyl CoA, accompanied by the substrate-level phosphorylation of ADP to ATP, as a step in the tricarboxylic acid (TCA) cycle. The ATP generated is then consumed in catabolic pathways. Since substrate-level phosphorylation does not require oxygen for ATP production, this reaction can rescue cells from cytosolic ATP depletion during ischemia. The reverse reaction generates succinyl-CoA from succinate to fuel ketone body and heme synthesis.

While SCS is ubiquitously expressed, SUCLA2 is predominantly expressed in catabolic tissues reliant on ATP as their main energy source, including heart, brain, and skeletal muscle. Within the brain, SUCLA2 is found exclusively in neurons; meanwhile, both SUCLA2 and SUCLG2 are absent in astrocytes, microglia, and oligodendrocytes. In order to acquire succinate to continue the TCA cycle, these cells may instead synthesize succinate through GABA metabolism of α-ketoglutarate or ketone body metabolism of succinyl-CoA.

Clinical significance 

Mutations in the SUCLA2 gene are associated with mitochondrial DNA (mtDNA) depletion syndrome. Symptoms include early onset low muscle tone, severe muscular atrophy, scoliosis, movement disorders such as dystonia and hyperkinesia, epilepsy, and growth retardation. Because succinic acid can not be made from succinyl coa, treatment is with oral succinic acid, which allows the krebs cycle, and electron transport chain to function correctly. Other treatments are managing symptoms and includes exercises to promote mobility, respiratory assistance, baclofen to treat dystonia and hyperkinesia, and antiepileptic drugs for seizures.

There is a relatively high incidence of a specific SUCLA2 mutation in the Faroe Islands due to a founder effect.  This particular mutation is often associated with early lethality.  Two additional  founder mutations in have been discovered in the Scandinavian population, in addition to the known SUCLA2 founder mutation in the Faroe Islands. These patients show a higher variability in outcomes with a number of patients with SUCLA2 missense mutation surviving into adulthood. This variability suggests that SUCLA2 missense mutations may be associated with residual enzyme activity.

Coenzyme Q10 and antioxidants have been used to treat mitochondrial DNA depletion syndrome but there is currently no evidence that these treatments result in clinical benefit.

Mutations in the SUCLA2 gene leading to SUCLA2 deficiency result in Leigh's or a Leigh-like syndrome with onset of severe hypotonia, muscular atrophy, sensorineural hearing impairment, and often death in early childhood.

See also 
Succinyl-CoA synthetase
SUCLG1
SUCLG2

References

Further reading

External links 
 GeneReview/NCBI/NIH/UW entry on SUCLA2-Related Mitochondrial DNA Depletion Syndrome, Encephalomyopathic Form, with Mild Methylmalonic Aciduria